Bədəlli is a village and municipality in the Gobustan Rayon of Azerbaijan.  It has a population of 977.  The municipality consists of the villages of Bədəlli and Üzümçü.

References 

Populated places in Gobustan District